The Royal Norwegian Order of Merit (Norwegian: Den Kongelige Norske Fortjenstorden (Bokmål) or Den Kongelege Norske Fortenesteordenen (Nynorsk)) was instituted by King Olav V in 1985.  It is awarded to foreigners,  Norwegian citizens living abroad, Ministry of Foreign Affairs diplomats, foreign civil servants in Norway, and Norway's honorary consuls for "outstanding service in the interests of Norway". Its counterpart, the Royal Norwegian Order of St. Olav, is generally only awarded to Norwegian citizens living in Norway.

Structure and insignia
The reigning monarch, King Harald V, is the Grand Master of the Order.  The order has five grades: Grand Cross, Commander (which is further subdivided into Commander with Star and Commander), and Knight (which is further subdivided into Knight 1st Class and Knight).

The Order is characterized by a ribbon of deep blue moiré.  The Grand Cross is worn on a broad sash that hangs over the right shoulder.  The Commander's Cross is worn around the neck on ribbon of the Order.  The Knight's Cross is worn over the left breast on a ribbon.  Women wear both the Commander's Cross and the Knight's Cross over the left breast on a ribbon of the Order that has been fashioned into a bow.  Unlike the Order of St. Olav, the insignia of the Royal Norwegian Order of Merit are the property of the recipient.

Conferment
Applications are submitted through the Protocol Department of the Royal Ministry of Foreign Affairs. The King receives the applications and confers the Order based on the council of the Lord Chamberlain of the Court, the Chief Protocol of the Royal Ministry of Foreign Affairs, and the Head of Chancery of the Royal Norwegian Order of St. Olav.

Recipients 

Grand Crosses
 Gabriele Albertini
 Prince Ali bin Hussein
 Princess Alia bint Hussein
 Princess Astrid of Belgium
 Juliana Awada
 Krister Bringéus
 Maria Cavaco Silva
 Princess Claire of Belgium
 Armand De Decker
 Laurent Fabius
 Werner Fasslabend
 Jaime Gama
 Princess Ghida Talal
 Harald V of Norway
 Jenni Haukio
 Toomas Hendrik Ilves
 Jean-Claude Juncker
 Kim Jung-sook
 Vytautas Landsbergis
 Prince Laurent of Belgium
 Marisa Letícia Lula da Silva
 Prince Lorenz of Belgium
 Luiz Inácio Lula da Silva
 Sauli Niinistö
 Olav V of Norway
 John D. Ong
 Christian Poncelet
 Eliza Reid
 Franz Schausberger
 Wolfgang Schüssel
 Prince Talal bin Muhammad
 Guy Verhofstadt
 Pieter van Vollenhoven
 Princess Zein bint Hussein
Commanders with Star
 Keith B. Alexander
 Grażyna Bernatowicz
 Micael Bydén
 Sverker Göranson
 Fred Kavli
 Franklin Miller
 Riho Terras
 Volker Wieker
Commanders
 Amjad Adaileh
 Elżbieta Bieńkowska
 Bjørn Olav Blokhus
 Stéphane Braunschweig
 Kjell H. Halvorsen
 John Hamre
 Helga Hernes
 Haakon Baardsøn Hjelde
 Mariss Jansons
 Lars-Emil Johansen
 Krzysztof Krajewski
 Irena Lichnerowicz-Augustyn
 Klaus Naumann
 Fred H. Nomme
 Arild Retvedt Øyen
 Jan Paulsen
 Svein Sevje
 Ingebjørg Støfring
 Conrad Swan
 Yury Yevdokimov
Knights
 Brian Bell (businessman)
 Jostein Helge Bernhardsen
 Martin Tore Bjørndal
 Sissel Birgitte Breie
 Finn Kristen Fostervoll
 Stephen E. Harding
 Thorir Hergeirsson
 Charles Letts
 Odd S. Lovoll
 Sverre Lyngstad
  John Jason Pantages
 Knut Ødegård
 Didrik Tønseth (diplomat)
 Sjur Torgersen
 Heiko Uecker
 Jon Westborg
Unknown Classes
 Aqel Biltaji
 Dinna Bjørn
 Rut Brandt
 Ingvard Havnen
 Graham John Hills
 Wilhelmina Holladay
 Stanisław Koziej
 Carl Epting Mundy Jr.
 Kathie L. Olsen
 Oda Sletnes

See also
 Orders, decorations, and medals of Norway

References

External links
 The Royal Norwegian Order of Merit Website of the Royal Court
 Statues of the Royal Norwegian Order of Merit (in Norwegian) Website of the Royal Court

Merit (Norway), Royal Norwegian Order of
1985 establishments in Norway